The men's canoe sprint K-2 1,000 metres at the 2016 Olympic Games in Rio de Janeiro took place between 17 and 18 August at Lagoa Stadium.

The medals were presented by Ivo Ferriani, IOC member, Italy and Helen Brownlee, Board Member of the ICF.

Competition format
The competition comprised heats, semifinals, and a final round. Heat winners advanced to the "A" final, with all other boats getting a second chance in the semifinals.  The top three from each semifinal also advanced to the "A" final, and competed for medals. A placing "B" final was held for the other semifinalists.

Schedule
All times are Brasilia Time (UTC-03:00)

Results

Heats
First boat qualified for the final, remainder go to semifinals.

Heat 1

Heat 2

Semifinals
The fastest three canoeists in each semifinal qualify for the 'A' final. The slowest two canoeists in each semifinal qualify for the 'B' final.

Semifinal 1

Semifinal 2

Finals

Final B

Final A

References

Canoeing at the 2016 Summer Olympics
Men's events at the 2016 Summer Olympics